was the 30th Emperor of Japan, according to the traditional order of succession.

The years of reign of Bidatsu start in 572 and end in 585; however, there are no certain dates for this Emperor's life or reign. The names and sequence of the early Emperors were not confirmed as "traditional" until the reign of Emperor Kanmu, who was the 50th monarch of the Yamato dynasty.

Traditional narrative
Historians consider details about the life of Emperor Bidatsu to be possibly legendary, but probable. The name Bidatsu-tennō was created for him posthumously by later generations.

In the Nihon Shoki, he is called .

His palace in Yamato Province was called Osada no Miya of Iware.

Events of Bidatsu's life
In the 15th year of Kimmei's reign, Bidatsu was named Crown Prince.

Soon after, Emperor Bidatsu is said to have acceded to the throne.

Bidatsu's contemporary title would not have been tennō, as most historians believe this title was not introduced until the reigns of Emperor Tenmu and Empress Jitō. Rather, it was presumably , meaning "the great king who rules all under heaven".

Bidatsu's reign was marked by power struggles about Buddhism. The two most important men in the court of Bidatsu were Soga no Umako and Mononobe no Moriya. Soga supported the growth of Buddhism, and Moriya wanted to stop it.

Bidatsu sought to re-establish relations with Korean Kingdoms and, according to Nihon Shoki, his court successfully established relations with Baekje and Silla, two of the Three Kingdoms of Korea.

The Emperor died from a disease which afflicted him with sores, apparently the first royal victim of smallpox in Japan.

The actual site of Bidatsu's grave is known. The Emperor is traditionally venerated at a memorial Shinto shrine (misasagi) at Osaka.

The Imperial Household Agency designates this location as Bidatsu's mausoleum. It is formally named Kawachi no Shinaga no naka no o no misasagi.

Genealogy
He was the second son of Emperor Kinmei. His mother, Ishi-hime, was a daughter of Emperor Senka.

Although he had many children, none of them would ever become Emperor. According to Gukanshō, Bidatsu had four empresses and 16 Imperial children (6 sons and 10 daughters).

Bidatsu's first empress, Hirohime, died in the fifth year of his reign. To replace her, he elevated one of his consorts, Princess Nukatabe, to the rank of empress. Nukatabe was his half-sister by their father Kinmei. Later she ascended to the throne in her own right and is today known as Empress Suiko.

He was succeeded first by one of his brothers, Emperor Yōmei, then by another, Emperor Sushun, and then Empress Suiko, his sister and wife, before his grandson, Emperor Jomei, eventually took the throne.

Empress: , Prince Okinaga-no-Mate's daughter
First Son: 

, Saiō
Empress: , later Empress Suiko, Emperor Kinmei's daughter
, married to Prince Shōtoku

, married to Prince Oshisako-no-Hikohito-no-Ōe

, father of Tachibana-no-Oiratsume (Prince Shōtoku's consort)
, married to Emperor Jomei
, married to Prince Oshisako-no-Hikohito-no-Ōe, later married to Prince Kume (Emperor Yomei's son)
Consort: , Kasuga no Nakakimi no Omi's daughter

Third Son: 
Concubine: , Ohoka no Obito no Okuma's daughter
, also 
, married to Prince Oshisako no Hikohito no Ōe

Ancestry

See also
 Emperor of Japan
 List of emperors of Japan
 Imperial cult

Notes

References
 Aston, William George. (1896).  Nihongi: Chronicles of Japan from the Earliest Times to A.D. 697. London: Kegan Paul, Trench, Trubner.  
 Brown, Delmer M. and Ichirō Ishida, eds. (1979).  Gukanshō: The Future and the Past. Berkeley: University of California Press. ;  
 Hopkins, Donald R. (2002).  The Greatest Killer. Chicago: University of Chicago Press. ; ;   
 Ponsonby-Fane, Richard Arthur Brabazon. (1959).  The Imperial House of Japan. Kyoto: Ponsonby Memorial Society. 
 Titsingh, Isaac. (1834).  Annales des empereurs du Japon (Nihon Ōdai Ichiran). Paris: Royal Asiatic Society, Oriental Translation Fund of Great Britain and Ireland.  
 Varley, H. Paul. (1980). Jinnō Shōtōki: A Chronicle of Gods and Sovereigns. New York: Columbia University Press. ;  

 
 

Japanese emperors
538 births
585 deaths
People of Asuka-period Japan
Buddhism in the Asuka period
6th-century monarchs in Asia
6th-century Japanese monarchs
Deaths from smallpox
Infectious disease deaths in Japan